Sanjay Potnis   is a Shiv Sena politician from Mumbai, Maharashtra. He is current Member of Legislative Assembly from Kalina Vidhan Sabha constituency of Mumbai, Maharashtra, India as a member of Shiv Sena.

Positions held
 2007: Elected as corporator in Brihanmumbai Municipal Corporation 
 2007-08: Chairman of Brihanmumbai Electric Supply and Transport (BEST) 
 2010-11: Chairman of Brihanmumbai Electric Supply and Transport (BEST)
 2014: Elected to Maharashtra Legislative Assembly
 2019: Re-Elected to Maharashtra Legislative Assembly

See also
 Mumbai North Central Lok Sabha constituency

References

External links
  Shivsena Home Page

Living people
Maharashtra MLAs 2014–2019
Year of birth missing (living people)